Michael P. Gamble (May 4, 1907 – November 4, 1992) was an Ohio Democratic Party politician and a member of the Ohio General Assembly. Formerly a Canton City Councilman, Gamble was elected to the Ohio House of Representatives in 1966.  A member of the 107th Ohio General Assembly, Gamble was a member of the first state legislature following redistricting from the 1965 Voting Rights Act. In 1968, Gamble lost reelection to Ross Heintzelman, cutting his House tenure to a single term.

Returning to Canton, he was elected as city treasurer, and served for a number of years. He also served as an alternative delegate for the 1972 Democratic National Convention. Gamble died in 1992, at the age of 85.

References

Democratic Party members of the Ohio House of Representatives
1907 births
1992 deaths
20th-century American politicians